Sonia Tschorne Berestesky (born 26 April 1954 in Santiago) is an architect and Chilean politician.

She studied architecture at the University of Chile, graduating in 1982. Later, she received a master's degree at the Catholic University of Chile in urban planning.

She has been a militant for the Socialist Party for the last 16 years, working with the governments of the Concertación de partidos por la democracia ( Pact of parties for democracy ) since 1990. She became the Ministry of Public Works' National Director of Architecture and Deputy Secretary  of Urban Development during the governments of Eduardo Frei Ruiz-Tagle and Ricardo Lagos.

As an architect, one of her last and most important works was the Master Building Plan of Central Santiago. 

In 2004, she was designated Minister of Housing, Urban Development and National Goods, succeeding Jaime Ravinet.

In 2008, she was serving as Chile's Undersecretary of Public Works.

References

1954 births
Living people
People from Santiago
University of Chile alumni
Pontifical Catholic University of Chile alumni
Chilean people of German descent
Chilean people of Polish descent
Chilean women architects
Socialist Party of Chile politicians
Government ministers of Chile
Women government ministers of Chile